The Return of the Herd is an oil on wood painting by Pieter Bruegel in 1565. The painting is one in a series of six works (High Springtime is presumed lost) that depict different seasons. The painting is currently in the collection of the Kunsthistorisches Museum, located in Vienna, Austria. The autumnal colors of the landscape and the bare trees connect this particular painting to October/November.

The surviving Months of the Year cycle are:

References

 The Return of the Herd at Kunsthistorisches Museum website (in German)

External links
Pieter Bruegel the Elder: Drawings and Prints, a full text exhibition catalog from The Metropolitan Museum of Art, which includes material on The Return of the Herd

1565 paintings
Cattle in art
Paintings by Pieter Bruegel the Elder
Paintings in the collection of the Kunsthistorisches Museum
Horses in art